Reasons and Persons  is a 1984 book by the philosopher Derek Parfit, in which the author discusses ethics, rationality and personal identity.

It is divided into four parts, dedicated to self-defeating theories, rationality and time, personal identity and responsibility toward future generations.

Summary

Self-defeating theories

Part 1 argues that certain ethical theories are self-defeating. One such theory is ethical egoism, which Parfit claims is 'collectively self-defeating' due to the prisoner's dilemma, though he does not believe this is sufficient grounds to reject the theory. Ultimately, Parfit does reject "common sense morality" on similar grounds.

In this section, Parfit does not explicitly endorse a particular view; rather, he shows what the problems of different theories are. His only positive endorsement is of "impersonal ethics" – impersonality being the common denominator of the different parts of the book.

Rationality and time

Part 2 focuses on the relationship between rationality and time, dealing with questions such as: should we take into account our past desires?, should I do something I will regret later, even if it seems a good idea now?, and so on.

Parfit's main purpose in Part 2 is to make an argument against self-interest theory. Self-interest theorists consider the differences between different persons to be extremely important, but do not consider the differences between the same person at different times to be important at all. Parfit argues that this makes self-interest theory vulnerable to attack from two directions. It can be compared to morality on one side, and 'present-aim theory' on the other. Parfit argues that our present aims can sometimes conflict with our long term self-interest. Arguments that a self-interest theorist uses to explain why it is irrational to act on such aims, can be turned against the self-interest theorist, and used as arguments in favor of morality. Conversely, arguments that a self-interest theorist uses against morality could also be used as arguments in support of 'present-aim' theory.

Personal identity

Part 3 argues for a reductive account of personal identity; rather than accepting the claim that our existence is a deep, significant fact about the world, Parfit's account of personal identity is like this:

At time 1, there is a person. At a later time 2, there is a person. These people seem to be the same person. Indeed, these people share memories and personality traits. But there are no further facts in the world that make them the same person.

 Parfit's argument for this position relies on our intuitions regarding thought experiments such as teleportation, the fission and fusion of persons, gradual replacement of the matter in one's brain, gradual alteration of one's psychology, and so on.  For example, Parfit asks the reader to imagine entering a "teletransporter," a machine that puts you to sleep, then destroys you, breaking you down into atoms, copying the information and relaying it to Mars at the speed of light.  On Mars, another machine re-creates you (from local stores of carbon, hydrogen, and so on), each atom in exactly the same relative position.  Parfit poses the question of whether or not the teletransporter is a method of travel—is the person on Mars the same person as the person who entered the teletransporter on Earth?  Certainly, when waking up on Mars, you would feel like being you, you would remember entering the teletransporter in order to travel to Mars, you would even feel the cut on your upper lip from shaving this morning.

Then the teleporter is upgraded. The teletransporter on Earth is modified to not destroy the person who enters it, but instead it can simply make infinite replicas, all of whom would claim to remember entering the teletransporter on Earth in the first place.

Using thought experiments such as these, Parfit argues that any criteria we attempt to use to determine sameness of person will be lacking, because there is no further fact.  What matters, to Parfit, is simply "Relation R," psychological connectedness, including memory, personality, and so on.

Parfit continues this logic to establish a new context for morality and social control. He cites that it is morally wrong for one person to harm or interfere with another person and it is incumbent on society to protect individuals from such transgressions. That accepted, it is a short extrapolation to conclude that it is also incumbent on society to protect an individual's "Future Self" from such transgressions; tobacco use could be classified as an abuse of a Future Self's right to a healthy existence. Parfit resolves the logic to reach this conclusion, which appears to justify incursion into personal freedoms, but he does not explicitly endorse such invasive control.

Parfit's conclusion is similar to David Hume's bundle theory, and also to the view of the self in Buddhism's Skandha, though it does not restrict itself to a mere reformulation of them. For besides being reductive, Parfit's view is also deflationary: in the end, "what matters" is not personal identity, but rather mental continuity and connectedness.

Future generations

Part 4 deals with questions of our responsibility towards future generations, also known as population ethics. It raises questions about whether it can be wrong to create a life, whether environmental destruction violates the rights of future people, and so on.

One question Parfit raises is this: given that the course of history drastically affects what people are actually born (since it affects which potential parents actually meet and have children; and also, a difference in the time of conception will alter the genetic makeup of the child), do future persons have a right to complain about our actions, since they likely wouldn't exist if things had been different? This is called the non-identity problem.

Another problem Parfit looks at is the mere addition paradox, which supposedly shows that it is better to have a lot of people who are slightly happy, than a few people who are very happy. Parfit calls this view "repugnant", but says he has not yet found a solution.

Reception 
Bernard Williams described Reasons and Persons as "brilliantly clever and imaginative", and commended it as part of a wave of work in analytic philosophy that deals with concrete moral problems rather than abstract meta-ethics.

Philip Kitcher wrote in his review of Parfit's On What Matters that Reasons and Persons "was widely viewed as an outstanding contribution to a cluster of questions in metaphysics and ethics".

Peter Singer included Reasons and Persons on a top ten list of favourite books in The Guardian, stating that "Parfit's penetrating thought and spare prose make this one of the most exciting, if challenging, works by a contemporary philosopher".

Writing for The New York Review of Books, the philosopher P.F. Strawson gave the book a positive review, stating "Very few works in the subject can compare with Parfit’s in scope, fertility, imaginative resource, and cogency of reasoning".

In an interview, David Chalmers said that he "loved" Reasons and Persons, saying that it gave him a "sense of how powerful analytic philosophy can be when done clearly and accessibly."

References

External links 
Reasons and Persons at Oxford Scholarship Online.

1984 non-fiction books
Books by Derek Parfit
Cognitive science literature
Contemporary philosophical literature
English-language books
Ethics books
Oxford University Press books
Thought experiments in philosophy